East Suffolk Complex is a historic school complex for African-American students located at Suffolk, Virginia. The complex consists of the East Suffolk Elementary School (1926-1927), East Suffolk High School (1938-1939), and the Gymnasium building (1951). The East Suffolk Elementary School, built as a Rosenwald School, is a one-story, Colonial Revival style, brick school with a central auditorium flanked by classrooms.  The East Suffolk High School is a Colonial Revival style, one-story brick building with a double-loaded corridor plan, and eight classrooms. It was built with Public Works Administration funds.  A cafeteria wing was added in 1952.  The Gymnasium is a concrete block building with applied 5-course American bond brick veneer.  The complex closed in 1979.  The complex is now a public recreation center.

It was added to the National Register of Historic Places in 2003.

References

Gallery

African-American history of Virginia
Rosenwald schools in Virginia
School buildings on the National Register of Historic Places in Virginia
School buildings completed in 1927
Colonial Revival architecture in Virginia
Schools in Suffolk, Virginia
National Register of Historic Places in Suffolk, Virginia
1927 establishments in Virginia